Elisabeth Brauss (born 1995 in Hannover) is a German pianist.

She began playing piano at the age of four. At the age of six she got her first lessons from Jelena Levit. Later she studied at the Hochschule für Musik, Theater und Medien Hannover with Jelena Levit, Matti Raekallio and Bernd Goetzke.

In 2013 she won the Tonali Grand Prix in Hamburg, was awarded the first prize at the Kissinger Klavierolymp in 2016, and is a BBC Radio 3 New Generation Artist from 2018 to 2020.

Elisabeth is the daughter of the German pianist Martin Brauß.

References

External links 
 

Living people
1995 births
Musicians from Hanover
German classical pianists
German women pianists
21st-century classical pianists
Women classical pianists
Oehms Classics artists
21st-century women pianists